John Catesby (died 1404/5), of Ashby St Ledgers, Northamptonshire and Warwickshire, Warwickshire, was an English Member of Parliament.

He was a Member (MP) of the Parliament of England for Warwickshire in 1372 and 1393.

Catesby was the son and heir of MP, William Catesby.

Catesby seems to have died in the winter of 1404–5. His estates were divided amongst his heirs, his three sons: William, John and Robert.

References

14th-century births
1405 deaths
Year of birth unknown
14th-century English people
People from Warwickshire
Members of the Parliament of England (pre-1707)